Erf  is a river of Bavaria and Baden-Württemberg, Germany. In Baden-Württemberg, it is called Erfa. It flows into the Main in Bürgstadt.

See also
List of rivers of Baden-Württemberg
List of rivers of Bavaria

References

Rivers of Baden-Württemberg
Rivers of Bavaria
Rivers of Germany